Abraham Stocker (26 December 1825, in Büron – 6 October 1887) was a Swiss politician, mayor of Lucerne (1865/1866) and President of the Swiss Council of States (1870).

External links 

1825 births
1887 deaths
People from Sursee District
Swiss Old Catholics
Members of the Council of States (Switzerland)
Presidents of the Council of States (Switzerland)
Mayors of places in Switzerland